Jo's Boys, and How They Turned Out: A Sequel to "Little Men" is a novel by American author Louisa May Alcott, first published in 1886.  The novel is the final book in the unofficial Little Women series. In it, Jo's children, now grown, are caught up in real world troubles.

Plot details
The book mostly follows the lives of Plumfield boys who were introduced in Little Men, particularly Tommy, Emil, Demi, Nat, Dan, and Professor Bhaer and Jo's sons Rob and Teddy, although the others make frequent appearances as well, and Josie and Bess, two cousins of Demi and Daisy. The book takes place ten years after Little Men.  Dolly and George become college students dealing with the temptations of snobbery, arrogance, self-indulgence, and vanity. Tommy becomes a medical student to impress childhood sweetheart Nan, but after trying to win her favor by "accidentally" falling in love with and proposing to Dora, he finds he is happier with her and quits medicine to join his family's business. Rob and Ted fall into a scrape with Dan's dog that draws them closer in the end.

Sections of Jo's Boys follow the travels of former students who have deep emotional ties to Plumfield and the Bhaers. Professor Bhaer's nephew Emil had become a sailor, encouraged by Mr. Bhaer, and works hard before being promoted and taking off on his first voyage as second mate, and gets a chance to shows his true strength when he is shipwrecked and the captain becomes badly injured, as he encourages and helps the sailors and the sick captain until they find refuge on a passing ship. Dan, after wandering as a sheep herder in Australia and such, and still having the ever-present admiration of Teddy, he seeks his fortune in the West, but when Dan ends up committing the one sin he and Jo always feared he would, though it was in defense of both self and a younger boy, Blair, when he kills a man who cheats Blair in gambling, Dan is sentenced to a year in prison with hard labor, and resists a prison escape and perseveres. Josie ends up discovering her actress hero and eventually wins her support and becomes a great actress herself, while Bess remains the "Princess" throughout, showing an unhealthy passion in art, but encouraged by her father, leaves her clay more often for the sun. Nat begins a musical career in Europe that takes him away from Daisy, only to fall in with a frivolous crowd and unintentionally leads a young woman on, whom he then does not marry, but makes things right when he narrowly avoids debt and lives on the right path for the rest of his time there.

Composition and publication history
Louisa May Alcott wrote the novel while living at the Thoreau-Alcott House on Main Street in Concord, Massachusetts. She bought the home for her sister Anna Alcott Pratt in 1877, though she moved in as well in the 1880s.

Adaptation
Nan becomes the focus of  Japanese animated television series Little Women II: Jo's Boys (Wakakusa Monogatari Nan to Jou Sensei).    Little Men (1940 film)  is loosely based on Jo’s Boys.

References

External links

 
 

1886 American novels
American children's novels
Novels by Louisa May Alcott
Novels republished in the Library of America
American bildungsromans
1880s children's books
Works based on Little Women
Sequel novels